MS European Gateway was a roll-on roll-off (RORO) car and passenger ferry built in 1975, originally owned and operated by Townsend Thoresen. The ship had 34 passengers and 36 crew at the time. Six people were killed in the capsizing. She was subsequently refloated and repaired, and served the Greek Islands as Penelope, until 2013 when she was scrapped at the Port of Piraeus.

Sister Ships
The European Gateway has three sister ships:
 European Enterprise 
 European Trader
 European Clearway

See also
 MS Herald of Free Enterprise - Another ferry owned by Townsend Thoresen which sank.
 Harwich Lifeboat Station for description of The European Gateway Disaster.

References

1974 ships
Maritime incidents in 1982